Si Estuvieras Conmigo (If You Were with Me) is the ninth studio album by Salvadoran singer Álvaro Torres, released on May 15, 1990 through EMI Latin. It was produced by Bebu Silvetti and recorded at Rusk Sound Studios, Los Angeles.

The album was a success in Latin America and the United States, peaking at number 5 in July 1990 on the Billboard Latin Pop Albums chart.

Track listing
All tracks are written by Álvaro Torres, except where noted.

Personnel 
Credits adapted from Si Estuvieras Conmigo liner notes.

Vocals

 Álvaro Torres – lead vocals
 Kenny O'Brien – backing vocals
 Maria Del Rey – backing vocals
 Michel Jimenez – backing vocals
 Nina Swan – backing vocals

Musicians

 Bebu Silvetti – arrangements, conducting, piano, keyboards
 José Peña – bass guitar
 Ezra Kliger – coordination
 Suzie Katayama – copyist
 Grant Geissman – guitar
 John Yoakum – tenor saxophone
 Alan Kaplan – trombone
 Charlie Davis – trumpet
 Ramon Flores – trumpet

Artwork

 Joe La Russo – photography

Production

 Bebu Silvetti – production
 Elton Ahi – mixing
 Eric Scheda – mixing
 Boon Heng Tam – engineering assistance
 Gustavo Borner – engineering assistance

Recording

 Recorded and mixed at Rusk Sound Studios, Los Angeles

Charts

Weekly charts

Year-end charts

References 

1990 albums
Álvaro Torres albums
EMI Latin albums